Bride's Pool is a small river in northeastern New Territories, Hong Kong near Tai Mei Tuk. The river is characterized by string of waterfalls with plunge pools. Mirror Pool is also located nearby.

Legend and namesake
Legend has it that a bride was being carried in a sedan by four porters on her way to meet her groom in stormy weather. As they passed the pool, one of the porters slipped and the bride fell into the pool and drowned. Therefore, the pool was named Bride's Pool in memory of the bride.

Transport 
Bride's Pool is located in the North East Region of the New Territories in Plover Cove Country Park. It can be accessed either by car or by public transport. By public transport take the MTR East Rail (formerly KCR East Rail) north from Kowloon into New Territories. Depart the train at Tai Po Market station and board minibus 20C. The bus will terminate at either Tai Mei Tuk or Wu Kau Tang depending on the route. On Sundays and public holidays, the Kowloon Motor Bus operates the route 275R from Tai Po Market station to the Pool. The Bride's Pool Trail lies past Tai Mei Tuk and shortly before Wu Kau as the bus heads north. If the bus terminates short of the Pool at Tai Mei Tuk, the pool can be accessed by taxi or a 2-3 hour hike.

See also
Plover Cove Country Park

References

Lakes of Hong Kong
Landforms of Hong Kong
North District, Hong Kong
Tai Po District